YTMND, an initialism for "You're the Man Now, Dog", is an online community centered on the creation of hosted memetic web pages (known within the community as fads, YTMNDs or sites) featuring a juxtaposition of an image (still or short animation) centered or tiled along with optional large zooming text and a looping sound file. Images and sound files used in YTMNDs are usually either created or edited by users. YTMND is generally considered to be a humor website, owing its tone and culture to the original YTMND and its early imitators.

History 
YTMND originated in 2001 from Max Goldberg's original website, "yourethemannowdog.com", which he registered along with "dustindiamond.com" after seeing a trailer for the movie Finding Forrester in which Sean Connery says the line "You're the man now, dog!". Originally, the website featured the text "YOURE THE MAN NOW DOG.COM" drawn out in 3D ASCII text with a sound loop from the Finding Forrester trailer of Sean Connery reciting the phrase "You're the man now, dog!". The advent of zoomed text currently on the website was seen in the following months, where the website also featured a photograph of Sean Connery. Goldberg's new
creation inspired others to make similar sites with other movie and television quotations (or any other sound clip they wished to use). At first, Goldberg maintained a list and mirror of these sites, but the list soon became exceptionally long.

In 2004, Goldberg wrote a press release after winning a lawsuit filed by Dustin Diamond for the "fan page" at the aforementioned dustindiamond.com. He mentioned yourethemannowdog.com, as well as a new website, YTMND, that would be ready by April 10. The website opened that day after a rushed coding and design process. The site caught on in popularity and became an Internet phenomenon when major weblogs and Internet forums began linking to the Picard Song YTMND.

Height of popularity 

In November 2005, YTMND changed its layout and added new features, including a comment management system and new lists for the main page. A feature debuted soon after allowing users to donate money on behalf of a YTMND chosen by the user in exchange for its increased exposure through the main site.

On September 24, 2006, YTMND changed to a new layout and design. The re-design added new features, such as the YTMND digest.

Decline 

On August 29, 2016, Max Goldberg announced that YTMND would likely soon be shutting down, citing ill health and the site's inability to fund its own hosting fees from ad revenue. Goldberg stated "Besides being a time capsule I don't really see a reason for it to continue to exist... It seems like the internet has moved on...And I've moved on too. I don't have much interest in the site beyond it being good memories."

In August 2018, Archive Team revealed that it had archived the entirety of the site's content up to that point. On May 12, 2018, the site stopped accepting new user signups as a result of Google shutting down version 1 of its ReCAPTCHA anti-spam mechanism.

In May 2019, the site experienced major downtime, which led media outlets to report that the site had been shut down permanently. The site itself partially came back online, with a page stating that there had been a "catastrophic failure" in its database, and stating that whether the site will be restored was undecided.

Modernization 
On May 17, 2019, Max Goldberg wrote to supporters on his Patreon that an "outpouring of support" had convinced him to work to save the site, opening a community Discord and soliciting input on modernizing the site. Suggestions included abandoning Adobe Flash Player in favor of HTML5, as well as implementing Transport Layer Security and "other modern necessities." On May 21, 2019, the main page was updated to reflect that YTMND subdomains and search functionality should be functional. He announced the launch of the HTML5 player using Ogg Vorbis on June 5, 2019. The restoration of search functionality on a repaired database was completed in December 2019.

On March 31, 2020, YTMND re-launched in earnest, including all of the previously hosted YTMND sites and the ability to log in, create accounts, recover passwords, and post new sites. It has also been updated to work using HTML5 media playable, HTTPS communications, and includes a mobile-friendly interface.

Conflicts

eBaum's World 
In January 2006, eBaum's World hosted and watermarked a Lindsay Lohan montage created by YTMND user SpliceVW without crediting either SpliceVW or YTMND. In response to their actions, users from YTMND joined users from other Internet communities and launched an attack on the forums on eBaum's World, using spam posting and denial-of-service attacks to repeatedly crash them.

Goldberg denounced the ongoing attacks, stating that they had "really crossed the line" and were a "vulgar display of power". He later stated that any YTMND member whose site promoted attacks would have his or her account deleted and that the conflict had placed both himself and his hosting company in a negative light.

On January 10, eBaum's World alleged the attacks were a form of cyberterrorism, and on January 11, Neil Bauman, the executive vice president of eBaum's World, publicly stated that arrests were being made in relation to the attacks. Eventually, Goldberg and Bauman came to an agreement: Bauman removed the montage from his website, and Goldberg removed references to "eBaum" from his. Though the conflict was resolved, both sites experienced DDoS attacks on the morning of January 12, 2006.

Church of Scientology 
On June 10, 2006, a cease and desist form was sent to Goldberg by lawyers of the Church of Scientology, claiming that several YTMND pages with Scientology-related content had infringed on Scientology copyrights. In response, Goldberg replied to the lawyer that the cease and desist form was "completely groundless" and he would not be deleting any Scientology-related sites. Days later, a Scientology page section appeared on the front page along with a disclaimer on the bottom stating the following: "This website is in no way affiliated, sponsored or owned by the Church of Scientology, L. Ron Hubbard, SeaOrg, Dianetics, volcanoes or aliens of any sort. We are, however, sponsored by Citizens for the Release of Xenu, a not-for-sanity organization." According to Goldberg, there have not been any recent updates regarding the potential lawsuit.

Sega 
On January 11, 2007, Goldberg revealed that Sega Europe had sent a cease and desist letter concerning the "Sonic Says..." fad, which features a clip from the Sonic animated series.  The letter alleged that consumers "may be confused into believing that [the offending pages are] in someway [sic] linked to or associated with" the company. In its letter, Sega stated that it would take legal action after seven days if ownership of all "that's no good" web domains were not handed over.  After almost two weeks of silence following the original 7-day limit, Goldberg declared the issue had "blown over."

Scholastic 
On July 17, 2007, Goldberg received a string of letters and phone calls from lawyers representing Scholastic threatening legal action if sites revealing spoilers for Harry Potter and the Deathly Hallows were not removed, in response to several YTMNDs with scanned pages that Goldberg posted on the front page. As more sites were created with spoilers, additional letters were sent. Goldberg responded to Scholastic by declining to take down Harry Potter-related sites.

Pez 
In May 2009, the Pez corporation sent a cease-and-desist letter regarding two YTMNDs depicting fake Pez dispensers with Adolf Hitler and Charles Manson's heads on the containers, which they found insulting, and demanded that YTMND refrain from allowing any Pez-related items to be displayed on the site. Goldberg responded by starting a fad contest involving the candy company, with the prize being a possible lawsuit.

Media exposure 
Due to the nature and format of YTMNDs, the site has garnered attention from outside media sources. In 2005, Reuters wrote an article on Tom Cruise which made a reference to the Tom Cruise Kills Oprah YTMND. The site received further publicity when The Wall Street Journal published an article about YTMND, and mentioned several popular website creations, linking to many of them through their website. The original "Tom Cruise Kills Oprah" video, on which the YTMND is based, was mentioned on Dateline NBC's "The Mank Blog" segment, VH1's show "Web Junk 20", and CBC Newsworld's "The Hour" with George Stroumboulopoulos.

On the February 1, 2006, episode of Attack of the Show!, viewers were asked to "make a kickass YTMND" for the show's "user created" segment. In order for sites to qualify for this YTMND competition, members were required to add "aots" at the beginning of the site's URL. In March, Game-Revolution held a contest for video game-themed YTMNDs. The winner won a PSP as a prize. In the March 2006 issue of Stuff magazine, there is a mention of the original "You're the Man Now Dog" website. YTMND was again mentioned in the magazine in June 2006 when a link to timetraveler.ytmnd.com was printed. In May, Current TV host and producer Max Lugavere was spotted wearing a YTMND T-shirt on the network. In the August 2006 issue of Wired, an article under the "Expert" column by the name of "1 Web Site, 250,000 Idiotic Clips. LOL!" was printed. In the article, five of Goldberg's favorite YTMNDs (You're the Man Now, Dog; Vader Coaster; Lohan Facial; LOL Internet; Blue Ball Machine) were mentioned, along with commentary from Max himself for each one.  The article's writer, James Lee, can be quoted as saying "Repeat an image loop and a sound file – as 24-year-old Max Goldberg with You're the Man Now, Dog – and pretty soon you'll have 4 million visitors a month and 120,000 contributors uploading their own clips." Also in August 2006, an effort of YTMND users to post satirical reviews on the Amazon page for Tuscan whole milk was covered by The New York Times.

YTMND was featured in an article for the July 30, 2006, issue of The Washington Post. The article describes how Goldberg conceived yourethemannowdog.com, its rise in popularity, and the elements of a YTMND site. The article also referred to the creators of YTMNDs as "artists". Goldberg signed a release for The Colbert Report to show Stephen Colbert-related YTMNDs. A select few seconds of a YTMND was shown. On November 23, The Washington Post reported on telemarketing pranks in which they named a number of websites, including howtoprankatelemarketer.ytmnd.com. Various other news reporting sites have printed the same article, including Reuters and The Wall Street Journal. A Swedish newspaper, metro, also included the site in a separate article.

See also 

eBaum's World
Something Awful
CollegeHumor
Newgrounds
List of internet forums

References

External links 

 YTMND.com
 YTMND Wiki – YTMND's official wiki
 Yourethemannowdog.com – the "original" YTMND website
 News – wise up – reflection and history of YTMND by Max Goldberg (30 April 2007)
 The History of YTMND - another reflection and history of YTMND by Max Goldberg (1 April 2010)

Internet properties established in 2001
Internet memes introduced in 2001
Internet memes introduced in the 2000s
American comedy websites
Internet forums
Parodies
Scientology and the Internet